Mohite Subodh Baburao (born 17 October 1961) was a member of the 14th Lok Sabha of India. He represented the Ramtek constituency of Maharashtra and was a member of the Shiv Sena (SS) political party until February 2007. In recent developments he left the party and joined Congress.

External links
 Official biographical sketch in Parliament of India website

Living people
1961 births
People from Maharashtra
Politicians from Nagpur
India MPs 2004–2009
Marathi politicians
India MPs 1999–2004
People from Nagpur district
Lok Sabha members from Maharashtra
Indian National Congress politicians from Maharashtra